The Jewell Building, at 15 N. Superior in Cambridge, Idaho, was built in 1905.  It was listed on the National Register of Historic Places in 1990.

It is a one-story timber-framed commercial building.  It was one of the earliest commercial buildings in the town and served as its general store for decades.

References

National Register of Historic Places in Washington County, Idaho
Buildings and structures completed in 1905
1905 establishments in Idaho